Sybra fervida is a species of beetle in the family Cerambycidae. It was described by Pascoe in 1865. It is known from Borneo.

References

fervida
Beetles described in 1865